"Anthem" is a song recorded by Canadian country artist Brett Kissel. The song was written by Phil Barton, Emma-Lee, and Karen Kosowski, and was the second single off his Juno Award-winning studio album We Were That Song.

Critical reception
Front Porch Music noted elements of dance and pop music in "Anthem". They called it a "departure" from Kissel's usual music stating it could "open up a brand new demographic for him and attract some new fans", and that it was "refreshing" and would "definitely be a hit".

Commercial performance
"Anthem" reached a peak of number 6 on the Billboard Canada Country chart dated March 24, 2018. It was certified Gold by Music Canada.

Music video
The official music video for "Anthem" was directed by Blake McWilliam and premiered on February 2, 2018.

Charts

Certifications

References

2018 songs
2018 singles
Brett Kissel songs
Songs written by Karen Kosowski
Songs written by Emma-Lee
Warner Music Group singles